Demetz is a surname. Notable people with the surname include:
IS 5 FOOT 3

André Demetz (1902–1977), French general
Danielle De Metz (born 1938), French actress
Frédéric-Auguste Demetz (1796–1873), French penal reformer and jurist
Georges Demetz (1865–1942), French General
Giustina Demetz (born 1941), Italian alpine skier
Lisa Demetz (born 1989), Italian ski jumper
Peter Demetz (born 1922), American literature scholar of Germany 
Vincenzo Demetz (1911–1990), Italian cross-country skier